207th Street may refer to:

 Fordham Road, or 207th Street, a major street in The Bronx borough of New York City
 207th Street Yard, a rail yard of the New York City Subway system

New York City Subway
 207th Street (IND Eighth Avenue Line); the northern terminal of the  train
 207th Street (IRT Broadway – Seventh Avenue Line); serving the  train